Edgell Island is one of Baffin Island's small offshore islands, located in the Arctic Archipelago in the territory of Nunavut. It lies in Davis Strait, near the entrance into Frobisher Bay. Black Bluff is a headland at the north end and is the only named feature on the island.

The island is named after Capt. Edgell who is also notable for his 1801 survey of Pacquet, Newfoundland and Labrador.

References 

Islands of Baffin Island
Islands of Hudson Strait
Uninhabited islands of Qikiqtaaluk Region